Nevis is a hamlet in central Alberta, Canada within the County of Stettler No. 6.

The hamlet is located in Census Division No. 7 and in the federal riding of Crowfoot.

Demographics 

See also 
List of communities in Alberta
List of designated places in Alberta
List of hamlets in Alberta

References 

Hamlets in Alberta
Designated places in Alberta
County of Stettler No. 6